Viktoria Wallén is a Swedish playwright and screenwriter.

Her one-act play Anna was staged at the Teaterverket theatre, Stockholm, Sweden during the spring season of 2022. Anna, a magical realist play, takes place in a fictionalized 17th century Sweden during the period of witch-hunts also known as the Great noise. The title character Anna expresses present-day values, and consequently faces charges of witchcraft. Wallén's first published play, Gallermannen ("The man behind bars"), explores the themes of guilt and repentance and takes place on a train.

Works
 Gallermannen (2016).
 Anna (2021).

References

1986 births
Living people
21st-century Swedish dramatists and playwrights
Swedish theatre critics
Women theatre critics
Swedish women dramatists and playwrights